Samuel Reeves Keesler, Jr. (April 11, 1896 – October 9, 1918) was a member of the United States Army Air Service in World War I posthumously awarded the Citation Star for gallantry.

Biography

Early life
Keesler was born in Greenwood, Mississippi on April 11, 1896. He was an outstanding student leader and athlete in high school and at Davidson College in North Carolina.

Military career
Keesler entered the U.S. Army on May 13, 1917. He was commissioned in the Signal Officers Reserve Corps on August 15, and he received training as an aerial observer at Post Field, Oklahoma, before sailing for France in March 1918.

After additional training in aerial gunnery and artillery fire control, Second Lieutenant Keesler was posted to the 24th Aero Squadron in the Verdun sector of the Western Front on August 26, 1918.

While performing a reconnaissance mission in the late afternoon of October 8, 1918, Keesler and his pilot, 1LT Harold W. Riley, were attacked by four enemy fighters. Keesler returned fire and shot down the leader, but Riley lost control of their badly damaged plane. Keesler continued to fend off the attackers with machine gun fire even as it fell. He was wounded six times in the chest and abdomen before the plane crash-landed. Lieutenant Keesler received an additional wound when the enemy fighters strafed them on the ground.

Captured by German ground troops, the two airmen were unable to receive immediate medical attention, and Keesler died the following day. On January 16, 1919, Lt. Riley recommended him for a decoration, citing his continued resistance all the way to the ground, despite his wounds. For his gallantry, Lieutenant Keesler was posthumously awarded the Silver Star on June 3, 1919.

Keesler Air Force Base in Biloxi, Mississippi was named in his honor.

Silver Star citation
General Orders: GHQ, American Expeditionary Forces, Citation Orders No. 3 (June 3, 1919)
Action Date: October 8, 1918
Service: Army Air Service
Rank: Second Lieutenant
Company: 24th Aero Squadron
Division: American Expeditionary Forces

By direction of the President, under the provisions of the act of Congress approved July 9, 1918 (Bul. No. 43, W.D., 1918), Second Lieutenant (Air Service) Samuel Reeves Keesler, United States Army Air Service, is cited (Posthumously) for gallantry in action and a silver star may be placed upon the ribbon of the Victory Medals awarded him. Second Lieutenant Keesler distinguished himself by gallantry in action while serving as an Aerial Observer with the 24th Aero Squadron, American Expeditionary Forces, in action near Verdun, France, 8 October 1918, in bringing down one of an enemy formation of four planes.

References

External links
Autobiography of Harold W. Riley, Harold W. Riley Collection (AFC/2001/001/02165), Veterans History Project, American Folklife Center, Library of Congress

1896 births
1918 deaths
United States Army Air Service pilots of World War I
American military personnel killed in World War I
People from Greenwood, Mississippi
Recipients of the Distinguished Service Cross (United States)
United States Army officers
American prisoners of war in World War I
World War I prisoners of war held by Germany
Recipients of the Silver Star